Joseph Andrew Quinn (Date of birth unknown – March 1893) was a Major League Baseball player in 1881. He played three games for two different teams that year: one for the Boston Red Caps as a first baseman and two for the Worcester Ruby Legs as a catcher. He also umpired a total of 25 National League games in 1881 and 1882.

External links
, or Retrosheet

1893 deaths
Major League Baseball catchers
Boston Red Caps players
Worcester Ruby Legs players
Year of birth unknown
19th-century baseball players
1856 births